HMS Gloucester was a  light cruiser built for the Royal Navy in the first decade of the 20th century. The ship was initially assigned to the Home Fleet upon commissioning in 1910 and was transferred to the Mediterranean Fleet in 1913. She was involved in the hunt for the German ships  and  after World War I began in August 1914. Gloucester was detailed several times during the war to search for German commerce raiders, but her only success was the capture of one supply ship in early 1915. She played a minor role in the Battle of Jutland in mid-1916 and then spent most of the rest of the war in the Adriatic Sea. The ship was placed in reserve in 1919 and was sold for scrap in 1921.

Design and description
The Bristol sub-class were rated as second-class cruisers suitable for a variety of roles including both trade protection and duties with the fleet. The ship had a crew of 480 officers and ratings.

The main armament of the Bristol class was two BL 6-inch (152 mm) Mk XI guns that were mounted on the centreline fore and aft of the superstructure and ten BL 4-inch Mk VII guns in waist mountings. All these guns were fitted with gun shields. Four Vickers 3-pounder (47 mm) saluting guns were fitted, while two submerged 18-inch (450 mm) torpedo tubes were fitted. This armament was considered rather too light for ships of this size by the Royal Navy, while the waist guns were subject to immersion in a high sea, making them difficult to work.

The Bristols were considered protected cruisers, with an armoured deck providing protection for the ships' vitals. As the protective deck was at the waterline, the ships were given a large metacentric height so that they would remain stable in the event of flooding above the armoured deck. This, however, resulted in the ships rolling badly making them poor gun platforms. One problem with the armour of the Bristols, which was shared with the other Town-class ships, was the sizable gap between the bottom of the gun shields and the deck, which allowed shell splinters to pass through the gap and made the guns' crews vulnerable to leg injuries in combat.

Construction and career
Gloucester was the eighth ship in the Royal Navy to be named after the eponymous port. The ship was laid down on 15 April 1909 by William Beardmore and Company at their Dalmuir shipyard and launched on 28 October. On being commissioned in October 1910, the ship was assigned to the 1st Battle Squadron of the Home Fleet. In January 1913, Gloucester was transferred to the 2nd Light Cruiser Squadron (LCS) in the Mediterranean.

Pursuit of Goeben and Breslau

As tensions rose with Germany in the first few days of August 1914, before Britain declared war, Gloucester was deployed at the mouth of the Adriatic Sea, together with the bulk of the Mediterranean Fleet, by its commander, Admiral Sir Archibald Berkeley Milne. Their task was to prevent the German battlecruiser  and the light cruiser  from linking up with the Austro-Hungarian Fleet. But Britain and Germany were not yet at war so Milne turned to shadow the Germans as they headed back to Messina, Sicily, to recoal. All three battlecruisers had problems with their boilers, but Goeben and Breslau were able to break contact and reached Messina by the morning of the 5th. By this time war had been declared, after the German invasion of Belgium, but an Admiralty order to respect Italian neutrality and stay outside a six-mile (10 km) limit from the Italian coast precluded entrance into the passage of the Strait of Messina where they could observe the port directly. Therefore, Milne stationed the battlecruisers  and Indefatigable at the northernwestern exit of the Strait of Messina as he still expected the Germans to break out to the west where they could attack French troop transports. He positioned Gloucester at the southeastern exit and sent Indomitable to recoal at Bizerte where she was better positioned to react to a German sortie into the Western Mediterranean.

The Germans sortied from Messina on 6 August and headed east, towards Constantinople, trailed by Gloucester which was radioing the German movements to Milne. Rear Admiral Wilhelm Souchon ordered Breslau to turn about and pretend to lay mines in an effort to scare off Gloucester. Captain Howard Kelly decided to attack the German ship in an effort to force Goeben to turn around to support her consort as the British ship was more heavily armed than Breslau. This caused Souchon to turn and open fire on the British cruiser and Kelly disengaged, having accomplished his goal. Gloucester fired 18 six- and 14 four-inch shells during the brief engagement, but only hit Breslau once to little effect. She was not hit in return. Kelly was forced to break off his pursuit at 16:40 as Milne had strictly forbidden him to pass Cape Matapan, Greece, and his coal was running low.

After the German ships safely reached Turkey, Gloucester was assigned to the squadron blockading the Dardanelles, the strait between the Aegean Sea and the Black Sea for the next several months. In November the ship was ordered into the Indian Ocean to search for German commerce raiders, although she was recalled shortly afterwards to rejoin the 2nd LCS of the Grand Fleet in home waters. By 18 March, she had been reassigned to the 3rd Light Cruiser Squadron of the Battle Cruiser Fleet. On 28 March, Gloucester captured the German raider's supply ship, in the Central Atlantic and Kronprinz Wilhelm was forced to intern herself a few weeks later for lack of supplies. Gloucester remained on patrol through the end of April, although it is likely that she rejoined her squadron in May. It has been long rumoured that she shelled Galway, Ireland during the Easter Rising in April 1916, but she was probably confused with the sloop , which did shell the outskirts of Galway a day before Gloucester arrived in Galway Bay landing 100 Royal Marines.

Battle of Jutland

Almost a year later, Gloucester participated in the Battle of Jutland on 31 May–1 June 1916. As the battle began, the 3rd LCS was screening Vice-Admiral David Beatty's battlecruisers as they searched for the German fleet and moved to support the 1st Light Cruiser Squadron after they had spotted the German ships. This put them out of position when Beatty turned south to pursue the German battlecruisers. After he turned north on encountering the main body of the German High Seas Fleet, the 3rd LCS were the first to encounter the screen of the Grand Fleet at 17:33. As Beatty turned east to rendezvous with them, Gloucester was unable to reach the head of the Grand Fleet's line and was forced to steer for the unengaged side to avoid fouling the range with her funnel smoke. The cruiser briefly engaged the disabled light cruiser  about 18:15. By 18:40, the squadron was in position to escort the 3rd Battlecruiser Squadron of the Grand Fleet.

By 20:10, Beatty's ships were in front of the Grand Fleet and the 3rd LCS was screening them when the flagship, spotted five cruisers of the 4th Scouting Group and the squadron closed to engage at full speed. By 20:38, the British lost sight of the Germans and turned away to assume their position at the head of Beatty's battlecruisers. The cruiser fired a total of 37 shells and was not damaged during the battle.

Subsequent operations
After the battle, the ship was reassigned to the 2nd Battle Squadron, and had been transferred to the 8th Light Cruiser Squadron in the Adriatic by December. Gloucester was detached to the Indian Ocean in March 1917 to search for the German commerce raider , but was recalled on 23 May. She remained in the Adriatic until the end of the war in November 1918. The ship was placed in reserve the following April, listed for disposal in March 1920 and was sold for scrap on 9 May 1921 to Thos. W. Ward, of Portishead and Briton Ferry.

Notes

Footnotes

Bibliography

External links
 
 Ships of the Bristol group
 Battle of Jutland Crew Lists Project - HMS Gloucester Crew List

 

Town-class cruisers (1910) of the Royal Navy
Ships built on the River Clyde
1909 ships
World War I cruisers of the United Kingdom